is a Japanese author and anime screenwriter from Shiga Prefecture, Japan. He is best known for the creation of the Full Metal Panic! franchise that includes light novels, manga and anime.

Gatoh first met with Koichi Chigira by accident when he bumped into him in Shinjuku when he was late for work. Later on, the two were shocked to meet with one another in the Gonzo Digimation office. The two would eventually team up to create the Full Metal Panic! anime television series.

2019 Greta Thunberg Twitter controversy
On December 7, 2019, Shoji Gatoh posted controversial remarks to his Twitter feed in response to an NHK report about teenage environmental activist Greta Thunberg's appearance at COP25, a climate change conference in Spain. The comments read, "I hate that kid. If I was the ruler of the world, I would steal everything from her, knock her into the depths of despair and ridicule her. On top of that, I'd feed her a delicious, piping hot steak and watch her shed bitter tears. I’d love to see that." Gatoh later removed his tweet in response to public backlash and apologized for writing it.

Tetsuro Kasahara, who illustrated the manga Full Metal Panic! Zero, tweeted in response, "I did the art for a manga created by this person, but I don't agree with his remarks. I will no longer do any promotion for Full Metal Panic! Zero, nor draw any continuation. I will also donate any profits from the manga to environmental groups." Following the apology of Gatoh, he redacted this statement.

Works
Light novels
 Full Metal Panic! series (published from December 18, 1999)
 Cop Craft: Dragnet Mirage Reloaded series (published from November 18, 2009)
 Amagi Brilliant Park series (published from February 20, 2013)

Manga
 Full Metal Panic! - Author
 Full Metal Panic! The Anime Mission (Resource Book Manga) - Author
 Amagi Brilliant Park - Author

Anime
 Full Metal Panic! - Original creator, Story Editor
 Full Metal Panic? Fumoffu - Screenplay (Eps. 1, 4, 8, 9, 12), Original creator
 Full Metal Panic! The Second Raid (TV) - Series Composition, Original creator
 Full Metal Panic! The Second Raid (OVA) - Screenplay, Original creator
 Hyouka - Series Composition
 Amagi Brilliant Park - Original creator, Series Supervision
 Full Metal Panic! Invisible Victory - Series Composition, Original creator
 Cop Craft - Series Composition, Original creator
 Estab Life: Great Escape - Series Composition, Script

References

External links
  
 

20th-century Japanese novelists
21st-century Japanese novelists
Light novelists
Living people
1971 births